A Gamble for Love is a 1914 sports novel by the British-Australian writer Nathaniel Gould. Like most of Gould's novels it is set in the world of horse racing.

Film adaptation
In 1917 the novel served as a basis for the British silent film A Gamble for Love directed by Frank Wilson.

References

Bibliography
 Goble, Alan. The Complete Index to Literary Sources in Film. Walter de Gruyter, 1999.

1914 British novels
Horse racing novels
Novels by Nathaniel Gould
British novels adapted into films